Taman Safari Indonesia or simply Taman Safari are animal theme parks in Cisarua, Prigen, and Bali. Being part of the same organization, they are known as Taman Safari I, II and III. The most popular is Taman Safari I.

Taman Safari I

Taman Safari I, or called as Taman Safari Bogor, is located at district Cisarua, on Bogor regency, on the old main road between Jakarta and Bandung, West Java. Taman Safari is located on Puncak, a tourist area in West Java.

Some, such as the Bali myna, are involved in conservation projects. The majority of the species represented are African.

Nine shows are offered, that is the Elephant Show, Safari Theater, Various Animals Show, Tiger Show, Sea Lion Show, Bird of Prey Show, Dolphin Show, Cowboy Show, and The Globe of Death.

Near the Wild Wild West, visitors can see the Jaksa Waterfall. To reach this waterfall, visitors can use the road train or walking about 500 meter. The height of the Jaksa Waterfall reaches 45 meters. Under the fall there is also a pool that is not too deep so that children can play in the water. The water of Jaksa Waterfall comes from the foot of Mount Gede Pangrango. If lucky, visitors can also see native wildlife, including several primates and birds. According to local legends, if someone who come to wash their face with Jaksa Waterfall's water, it will make them easier to find a mate, stay young, and make their sustenance easier. For other facilities, Taman Safari provides canteen and changing room.

Every week night or holiday night, visitors can explore the Safari Journey at night with a road train accompanied by guides. Near the end of the trip, visitors can watch the Spectacular Light Dance, where the performers will perform fire performances. The zoo's Javan warty pig can only be seen in the Night Safari.

Every weekend and holiday, visitors can hike around the forest surrounding the park. Before starting to hike, visitors are guided by a guide to do exercises. Visitors accompanied by guides during the hike. Visitors are taught about medicinal plants by the guide, see native wildlife from a distance, visit the Javan leopard and Javan rusa breeding facility, and visit an abandoned colonial era house. At the end of the hike, visitors can enjoy several games.

History 
Taman Safari I was built in 1980 on 50 hectares of unproductive plantation land. In 1990, the park was named as a National Tourism Object by Soesilo Soedarman, the Minister of Tourism, Postal, and Telecommunication at that time.

In September 2017, Taman Safari introduced two giant pandas named Cai Tao (蔡涛) and Hu Chun (胡春). Cai Tao and Hu Chun were born at the Bifengxia Panda Base in Bifengxia, Ya'an, Sichuan, China. The arrival process of Cai Tao and Hu Chun had been carried out for a long time, marked by the construction of the "Panda Palace" which would later become their home in Taman Safari. Cai Tao and Hu Chun have traveled more than 4,400 kilometers, taking off from Shuangliu International Airport in Chengdu, China on September 28, 2017, traveling five and a half hours until arriving at Soekarno–Hatta International Airport. After undergoing an adjustment period of approximately two months, the two of them finally began to be displayed in November 2017. In front of Panda Palace are two replica statues of Cai Tao and Hu Chun welcoming the visitors. Panda Palace is also equipped with several facilities including the food court and souvenir store. To avoid noise caused by vehicles, visitors must take a bus to go to the Panda Palace.

Taman Safari II
Taman Safari II is a branch of Taman Safari located in Prigen, Pasuruan, East Java.

Bali Safari and Marine Park

Bali Safari and Marine Park is a branch of Taman Safari located in Marina Beach in Bali.

Batang Dolphin Center
Batang Dolphin Center is a branch of Taman Safari located in the Sigandu beach, Batang Regency, Central Java
The park mainly focus on bottlenose dolphin, but the park also have other animal exhibits like sea turtles touch pool, mini safari, bird aviary, reptile exhibits, and freshwater aquarium.

Jakarta Aquarium

Jakarta Aquarium is located inside the Neo Soho mall, Jakarta. The aquarium have saltwater, freshwater, brackish, and land animals from around the world.

Criticism 
The company came under fire in April 2016 for its alleged practice of drugging wild animals in order to utilise them as props in photographs with tourists. The company stated the pictured lion had not been drugged and was 'just sleepy'.

Gallery

Taman Safari I

See also

List of zoos
List of amusement parks in Asia

References

External links

Map of Taman Safari

Safari parks
Zoos in Indonesia
Buildings and structures in West Java
Tourist attractions in West Java
Bogor
Zoos established in 1990
1990 establishments in Indonesia
Amusement parks opened in 1990